The Palliser River is a tributary of the Kootenay River in the Canadian province of British Columbia. It is part of the Columbia River basin, as the Kootenay River is a tributary of the Columbia River.

The Palliser River is named in honor of John Palliser, whose Palliser Expedition explored the Canadian Rockies from 1857 to 1859.

Course
The Palliser River originates in Height of the Rockies Provincial Park, in the Rocky Mountains on the west slopes of the Continental Divide. Its headwaters are located near Palliser Pass. The river flows south then west to join the Kootenay River. Albert River joins the Palliser River shortly before its confluence with the Kootenay River.

See also
List of British Columbia rivers
Tributaries of the Columbia River

References

Rivers of British Columbia
Tributaries of the Kootenay River